Nicolás Barrientos and Ernesto Escobedo were the defending champions but chose not to defend their title.

Andrew Harris and Christian Harrison won the title after defeating Robert Galloway and Max Schnur 6–3, 6–4 in the final.

Seeds

Draw

References

External links
 Main draw

Little Rock Challenger - Doubles
Little Rock Challenger